Pseudosphex igniceps is a moth of the subfamily Arctiinae. It was described by Max Wilhelm Karl Draudt in 1915. It is found in Peru.

References

Pseudosphex
Moths described in 1915